Trinidad and Tobago competed at the 2015 World Aquatics Championships in Kazan, Russia from 24 July to 9 August 2015.

Swimming

Trinidad and Tobago swimmers have achieved qualifying standards in the following events (up to a maximum of 2 swimmers in each event at the A-standard entry time, and 1 at the B-standard):

Men

References

External links
Amateur Swimming Association of Trinidad and Tobago

Nations at the 2015 World Aquatics Championships
2015 in Trinidad and Tobago sport
Trinidad and Tobago at the World Aquatics Championships